In measure theory, a branch of mathematics, Kakutani's theorem is a fundamental result on the equivalence or mutual singularity of countable product measures. It gives an "if and only if" characterisation of when two such measures are equivalent, and hence it is extremely useful when trying to establish change-of-measure formulae for measures on function spaces. The result is due to the Japanese mathematician Shizuo Kakutani.

Statement of the theorem

Furthermore, equivalence holds precisely when the infinite product

has a nonzero limit;  or, equivalently, when the infinite series

converges.

References

  (See Theorem 2.12.7)
 

Probability theorems
Theorems in measure theory